2016 Fukushima United FC season.

Squad
As of 22 February 2016.

J3 League

References

External links
 J.League official site

Fukushima United FC
Fukushima United FC seasons